Caesar IV is a  city-building game set in ancient Rome, developed by Tilted Mill Entertainment and published by Sierra Entertainment (Vivendi Universal Games). The game was released on September 26, 2006 in North America. The game features a three-dimensional game engine and individual modeling of game character behaviors.

Like its original release Caesar in 1992, the game simulates city administration in historical Rome. Like its sibling release Children of the Nile in 2004, the game continues a new trend in the city building game genre to use more interactive and detailed game video game design and gameplay.

Gameplay 
In a departure from older versions in the series, Caesar IV is equipped with variable, realistic 3D instead of fixed, isometric 3D. This means more realistic landscapes and city views, and the ability for players to better see and use game building space. In addition, buildings and roads may be placed at 45 degree angles to the playing grid, as well as aligned with the grid, allowing game players more options in creating efficient and visually appealing city layouts.

In an attempt at historical realism, the game tries to stay as close to proper Roman lifestyles as possible. To this end, Sierra Games did detailed research into Roman lifestyles using  secondary sources and primary sources.

The game is divided in three parts, named after the three traditional eras of Ancient Rome: "Kingdom", "Republic" and "Empire". The Kingdom part is a tutorial, while the Republic and Empire parts make up the campaign, where one can choose between peaceful and military assignments.

Reception 

Caesar IV received mixed reviews, with review aggregator website Metacritic giving it a rating of 74.  Positive aspects mentioned were the city building, large amount of content, visually appealing 3D graphics and professional sound and music. However, there were complaints centering around crashes, user interface issues, lag problems and repetitive game play.

The Australian video game talk show Good Game's two reviewers gave the game a 6/10 and 8/10.

References

External links 
 Official website via Internet Archive
 Caesar IV at MobyGames

2006 video games
City-building games
Multiplayer and single-player video games
Multiplayer online games
Sierra Entertainment games
Titan (game engine) games
Video game sequels
Video games scored by Keith Zizza
Video games set in antiquity
Video games set in the Roman Empire
Windows games
Windows-only games
Video games developed in the United States